Eternity and a Day is a soundtrack album by Greek composer Eleni Karaindrou featuring music for the film Eternity and a Day by Theodoros Angelopoulos recorded in 1998 and released on the ECM New Series label.

Reception
The Allmusic review by Steve Huey awarded the album 4 stars stating "Impressively, the music stands well on its own, apart from the context of the film; that's the sign of a well-composed soundtrack".

Track listing
All compositions by Eleni Karaindrou except as indicated
 "Hearing the Time" - 3:08
 "By the Sea" - 1:47
 "Eternity Theme" - 2:18
 "Parting A" - 1:31
 "Depart and Eternity Theme" - 4:02
 "Borders" - 2:41
 "Wedding Dance" (Traditional) - 1:28
 "Parting B" - 1:30
 "To a Dead Friend" - 4:34
 "Eternity Theme (Variation I)" - 1:48
 "Depart and Eternity Theme (Variation I)" - 3:02
 "Bus - Part I" - 1:08
 "Depart and Eternity Theme (Variation II)" - 6:50
 "Bus - Part II" - 0:56
 "Trio and Eternity Theme" - 2:12
 "The Poet" - 3:04
 "Depart and Eternity Theme (Variation III)" - 2:34
 "Depart" - 1:57
 Recorded at Athens Concert Hall in March and April 1998.

Personnel
Eleni Karaindrou - piano
Vangelis Christopoulos - oboe
Nikos Guinos, Manthos Halkias - clarinet
Spyros Kazianis - bassoon
Vangelis Skouras - french horn
Aris Dimitriadis - mandolin
Iraklis Vavatsikas - accordion
String Orchestra La Camerata Athens - Loukas Karytinos director

References

ECM New Series albums
ECM Records soundtracks
Eleni Karaindrou albums
1998 albums
Albums produced by Manfred Eicher